Jeffrey Thys  (born 14 April 1988, in Brasschaat) is a Belgian field hockey Player. At the 2012 Summer Olympics, he competed for the national team in the men's tournament.

References

External links
 

1988 births
Living people
Belgian male field hockey players
Field hockey players at the 2012 Summer Olympics
Olympic field hockey players of Belgium
People from Brasschaat
KHC Dragons players
Sportspeople from Antwerp Province